Jesse William Curtis Jr. (December 26, 1905 – August 5, 2008) was a United States district judge of the United States District Court for the Southern District of California and the United States District Court for the Central District of California.

Education and career

Born in San Bernardino, California, Curtis received a Bachelor of Arts degree from the University of Redlands in 1928 and a Juris Doctor from Harvard Law School in 1932. He was in private practice in San Bernardino from 1932 to 1953, including after 1946 with his father, Jesse W. Curtis Sr., who was an associate justice of the California Supreme Court. Curtis was a Judge of the Superior Court of San Bernardino County from 1953 to 1962.

Federal judicial service

Curtis was nominated by President John F. Kennedy on August 3, 1962, to the United States District Court for the Southern District of California, to a new seat authorized by 75 Stat. 80. He was confirmed by the United States Senate on August 25, 1962, and received his commission on August 27, 1962. He was reassigned by operation of law to the United States District Court for the Central District of California on September 18, 1966, to a new seat authorized by 80 Stat. 75. He assumed senior status on December 31, 1975. His service terminated on February 5, 1990, due to his retirement. Curtis died on August 5, 2008, in Irvine, California.

Notable case

Curtis was the judge in Madrigal v. Quilligan, involving the sterilization of Latina women in Los Angeles. No más bebés is a documentary film made about this case.

References

Sources
 

1905 births
2008 deaths
University of Redlands alumni
Harvard Law School alumni
California state court judges
Judges of the United States District Court for the Southern District of California
Judges of the United States District Court for the Central District of California
United States district court judges appointed by John F. Kennedy
20th-century American judges